Sanguri may refer to:

Sanguri group of tectonic features bisecting the Sivalik Hills
Sanguri Wari nihou tyo dhara pani, a song by Tara Devi (singer)
Sangurí, a stream near Santa Rosa, Paraguay
Sangurí, 90.7 FM in Santa Rosa; see List of radio stations in Paraguay
Moti Ram Sanguri; see List of Kumaonis